Sean Alfred Uilisi "Willis" Halaholo (born 6 July 1990) is a Welsh rugby union player who plays as a centre for the Cardiff Rugby and the Wales national team. Born in Auckland, New Zealand, to parents of Tongan descent, he qualified to play for Wales on residency grounds after moving to the country in 2016. Earlier that year, he was part of the Hurricanes team that won its first ever Super Rugby title.

Career
After winning the Auckland Secondary Schools title with Mount Albert Grammar School, Halaholo was named in the 2007 New Zealand Secondary Schools team alongside All Blacks Tawera Kerr-Barlow, Elliot Dixon and Charlie Ngatai for their tour of Australia.

Halaholo also played for Tonga U20 at the 2009 IRB Junior World Championship in Japan.

Halaholo began his senior club rugby career with Grammar Carlton before moving to Silverdale to reunite with MAGS coach Charlie McAlister.

After a move back to his junior club, Suburbs, in Auckland, Halaholo caught the attention of Southland selectors and headed to New Zealand's far south to gain his ITM Cup break with the Stags in 2013.   He made a big impact in Invercargill and after two seasons with the Stags, he was named in the Hurricanes squad for the 2015 Super Rugby season.

Behind the All Blacks midfield combination of Ma'a Nonu and Conrad Smith, Halaholo managed only a handful of appearances off the bench.

In 2016 Halaholo was offered a downgraded wider training squad contract and, after starting the season on the bench, earned a place in the starting team which won the Hurricanes' first Super Rugby title, defeating the Lions 20-3 in the final at Westpac Stadium.

At the conclusion of the 2016 Mitre 10 Cup he joined Cardiff on a three-year contract.

International
Halaholo was named in the Wales squad for the first time for the uncapped international against the Barbarians on 30 November 2019 after qualifying for Wales through the residency rule. 

Following injuries to fellow centres Johnny Williams, Jonathan Davies and George North, Halaholo was recalled to the Wales squad for their 2021 Six Nations Championship match against Scotland on 13 February 2021. With Nick Tompkins and Owen Watkin picked to start, Halaholo was named on the bench for the game.  He made his international debut in the 32nd minute, when fullback Leigh Halfpenny went off for a head injury assessment.

Halaholo earned his second cap for Wales as a replacement in their match against England on 27 February, 2021.  This match was the first in history in which Wales had scored 40 points against England.

References

1990 births
Living people
New Zealand rugby union players
Rugby union centres
Southland rugby union players
Hurricanes (rugby union) players
New Zealand sportspeople of Tongan descent
Rugby union players from Auckland
Waikato rugby union players
Cardiff Rugby players
New Zealand expatriate rugby union players
New Zealand expatriate sportspeople in Wales
Welsh rugby union players
Wales international rugby union players
Expatriate rugby union players in Wales